The Knave of Clubs is a former pub at 25 Bethnal Green Road, Shoreditch, London E1. It closed in July 1994, and since 2001 has been Les Trois Garçons, a restaurant.

It is a Grade II listed building, built in 1880.

References

External links
 

Grade II listed pubs in London
Shoreditch
Former pubs in London
Pubs in the London Borough of Tower Hamlets
Grade II listed buildings in the London Borough of Tower Hamlets